Hāena State Park is a state park on the north shore of the Hawaiian island of Kauai. It is often called the "end of the road" and marks the endpoint of the Kuhio Highway. The park provides access to beaches, trails, and several ancient Hawaiian sites, including sea caves estimated to be more than 4,000 years old. Archaeological sites associated with the hula, including a heiau (shrine) dedicated to Laka, are above the park's beaches.

Description

The small parking lot was not large enough to accommodate all the visitors, so an overflow parking lot was built. The beach has a relatively safe lagoon, but very strong currents have been reported at the bay, especially in the winter. Amenities at the park include pay phones, picnic tables, restrooms and outdoor showers.

Limahuli Stream enters the ocean at the park's eastern edge. South of the park, Makana mountain soars above Limahuli Garden and Preserve in the valley. Just before the Kēē beach is the Kalalau Trail trailhead, an  footpath that is the only land access to Nā Pali Coast State Park. The area surrounding the beaches is vegetated by ironwood trees, coconut palms, ti, and guava.

Beaches

Kēē Beach is at the park's western edge. This beach is west of Tunnels Beach (aka "Makua Beach" at Haena Point), which refers to the large waves that are thought to be ideal for surfing. Kēē Beach has a unique reef lagoon that makes the water calm and attractive for snorkeling and swimming. Beyond the reef, very strong currents, especially in the winter, have been reported. In Hawaiian, Kēē means "avoidance", referring to stories in Hawaiian mythology about the goddess Pele and Lohiau.
Hāena Beach is just east of Haena State Park. Haena is Hawaiian for "red hot".

References

External links
 Save Our Seas -Haena.org
 

Beaches of Kauai
State parks of Hawaii
Protected areas of Kauai